, born September 13, 1991, in Amagasaki, Hyōgo Prefecture, Japan, is a Japanese actor who is represented by the talent agency, Cast Corporation.

Biography
During high school, Matsuda appeared in the stage play, Urasuji3, and decided to become an actor. In April 2010, he moved to Tokyo, and later he belonged to his current office in 2011. In the same year, Matsuda's acting debut was in an advertisement for Osaka University of Human Sciences.

In 2012, his first starring role was in the stage musical, Hakuōki. Later on, Matsuda later starred in the stage plays, Messiah: Dō no Shō and Zipang Pirates, and appeared in other stage plays.

In 2013, he made regular appearances as Hideyasu Jonouchi / Kamen Rider Gridon in Kamen Rider Gaim.

In 2021, Matsuda got his role as Kashuu Kiyomitsu in Touken Ranbu Stage. His first debut was on Aozora no Tsuwamono -Osaka Fuyu no Jin-

Filmography

TV series

Films

References

External links
Official profile 
 

21st-century Japanese male actors
1991 births
Living people
Actors from Hyōgo Prefecture
People from Amagasaki